Charles Restieaux (19 February 1865 – 24 December 1918) was a New Zealand cricketer. He played three first-class matches for Auckland in 1900/01.

See also
 List of Auckland representative cricketers

References

External links
 

1865 births
1918 deaths
New Zealand cricketers
Auckland cricketers
Cricketers from Christchurch